Shirley is a small village and civil parish in Derbyshire,  south-east of Ashbourne. The population of the civil parish as taken at the 2011 Census was 270. It is situated in the countryside on top of a small hill.

History
Shirley was mentioned in the Domesday book as belonging to Henry de Ferrers and being worth forty shillings.

In the nineteenth century St Michael's Church, Shirley was led by the Rev. Charles Francis Powys who had a number of literary children.

Notable residents
 John Cowper Powys, born in the town, "Derbyshire's most prolific author", according to Tom Bates
 Theodore Francis Powys, born in the town, author
 Gertrude Mary Powys, born in the town, painter
 Littleton Charles Powys, author and headmaster of Sherborne School
 Prof. Rev. Walter Waddington Shirley, historian at Oxford University
 Rev. William Richardson Linton, clergyman and botanist who wrote a Flora of Derbyshire and discovered Rubus durescens, a bramble endemic to Derbyshire

See also
Listed buildings in Shirley, Derbyshire

Notes

References

External links 

 Village website
 Shirley Photographs and History
 Website for Shirley including aerial photos

Villages in Derbyshire
Derbyshire Dales